"What Mattered Most" is a song written by Gary Burr and Vince Melamed, and recorded by American country music singer Ty Herndon. It was released in February 1995 as Herndon's debut single and served as the lead single and title track from his debut album  What Mattered Most. It became Herndon's first number-one single on the Billboard Hot Country Singles & Tracks chart.

History
Upon its release, the song was added to the playlists of 133 radio stations surveyed by Billboard, breaking a record set by Tracy Lawrence for the most adds in one week.

The song was later included as the B-side to Herndon's early-1996 single "In Your Face," which peaked at 63 on the country charts.

Critical reception
Deborah Evans Price of Billboard magazine reviewed the song unfavorably saying that while Herndon turns in a "credible vocal performance", it is "a shame that this formulaic, by-the-numbers song, written by two Nashville pros, doesn't make much of an impression." Michael McCall of New Country was more positive, calling it "a powerful, sensitive song about a man who realizes, too late, that he noticed everything about his lover except what was in her heart."

Personnel
From What Mattered Most liner notes.

 Gary Burr - background vocals
 Joe Chemay - bass guitar
 Dan Dugmore - steel guitar
 Paul Franklin - Dobro
 Rob Hajacos - fiddle
 Kraig Hutchens - electric guitar
 Mike Jones - background vocals
 Paul Leim - drums
 Terry McMillan - percussion
 Steve Nathan - keyboards
 Brent Rowan - electric guitar
 Biff Watson - acoustic guitar

Music video
The music video was directed by Steven Goldmann and premiered in early 1995.

Chart positions
"What Mattered Most" debuted at number 62 on the U.S. Billboard Hot Country Singles & Tracks for the week of February 25, 1995.

Year-end charts

2019 version

On June 4, 2019, Herndon re-released the song for Pride Month. For this version, Herndon swapped the gender pronouns to reflect his status as an openly gay man. The single is the first released from his Got It Covered record, released in August. Its release marks Herndon's return to his standard country pop after the release of four dance singles. Herndon revealed in an interview with NPR that he was in a closeted relationship with a man at the time of the song's original release in 1995. That relationship and that of his parents inspired his performance of the track. After coming out of closet, Herndon began performing the song with mixed genders, beginning the song with its traditional lyrics and switching to male pronouns before the end.

Music video

The music video for the updated version of What Mattered Most features Herndon singing in a studio and surrounded by sound engineers and producers. He introduces the video by saying that he is now "brave enough" to record the song the way it should have been recorded.

References

1995 songs
1995 debut singles
Ty Herndon songs
Songs written by Gary Burr
Songs written by Vince Melamed
Song recordings produced by Doug Johnson (record producer)
Music videos directed by Steven Goldmann
Epic Records singles
LGBT-related songs